In music, Op. 100 stands for Opus number 100. Compositions that are assigned this number include:

 Brahms – Violin Sonata No. 2
 Dvořák – Violin Sonatina
 Reger – Variations and Fugue on a Theme by Hiller
 Schubert – Piano Trio No. 2
 Schumann – The Bride of Messina